Middleton Tavern is a tavern in Annapolis, Maryland. It is one of the oldest continuously operating taverns in the United States.

History
The Middleton Tavern was established in 1750 by Horatio Middleton. It initially operated as an inn for seafaring men. After Horatio's death. His son, Manuel, ran the business. George Washington, Thomas Jefferson, Benjamin Franklin and members of the Continental Congress frequented the place.

During the 1800s the family business included a general store and meat market. The Mandris family then bought the business and established a restaurant and a souvenir shop. Jerry Hardesty bought the property at 1968 and renamed the business into Middleton Tavern.

Description
The building is of Georgian style architecture. It is a 3-story brick structure. Its walls are decorated with civil war muskets and antique naval uniforms.

References

Taverns in Maryland
Annapolis, Maryland
1750 establishments in Maryland